Shin Young-Rok (born 27 March 1987 in Seoul) is a South Korean football forward who plays for Jeju United in the K-League. He usually plays as a centre forward or a striker. Shin is renowned for his strength in holding up the ball, excellent close control and dribbling skills, aerial ability, and power and accuracy of his shooting.

Cha Bum-Kun, the most prolific South Korea striker of all time, has praised his precision in penalty area which he claims is better than his during his days as a footballer.

He was the top scorer and MVP at the U-19 Qatar International Tournament, held in 2006.

He joined Bursaspor in January 2009.

While at Bursaspor Shin scored his first goal in only his second full match for the club against Gençlerbirliği on 8 February 2009. In spite of enjoying moderate success with Bursaspor, Shin's short career in Turkey came to an abrupt end when he walked out on his club due to contract violations (disputed between the player and club).  Despite threats from Bursaspor, Shin returned clubless to South Korea and signed with FC Tom Tomsk at the end of December, 2009. However, the contract problem with his former club prevented him from joining or playing for Tom Tomsk.

On 28 January 2011 Shin completed a move to Jeju United for an undisclosed fee.

On 8 May 2011, Shin entered the game against Daegu at the 82nd minute. After chipping in a shot just before the end, he fell down on the pitch, suffering a heart attack. Medical staff immediately provided cardiopulmonary resuscitation on site. Once he started breathing again, he was quickly taken to a local hospital, where he remained uncouncious. After 50 days in coma he miraculously woke up and was transferred to a hospital in Seoul, where he is currently receiving further diagnosis and treatment.

Honours

Individual
U-19 Qatar International Tournament MVP & Top Scorer: 2006

Club
Suwon Bluewings
K League Champions: 2004, 2008
FA Cup Winners: 2010
League Cup Winners: 2005, 2008
Korean Super Cup Winners: 2005
A3 Champions Cup Winners: 2005

Career statistics

References

External links
 
 Shin Young-rok – National Team Stats at KFA 
 
 

1987 births
Living people
Association football forwards
South Korean footballers
South Korean expatriate footballers
South Korea international footballers
Suwon Samsung Bluewings players
Jeju United FC players
Bursaspor footballers
K League 1 players
Süper Lig players
Expatriate footballers in Turkey
Footballers at the 2008 Summer Olympics
Olympic footballers of South Korea
Footballers from Seoul
South Korean expatriate sportspeople in Turkey